McLean Independent School District is a public school district based in McLean, Texas (USA).  Located in Gray County, small portions of the district extend into Collingsworth, Donley, and Wheeler counties. The community of Alanreed also lies within the district.  McLean ISD has one school that serves students in grades pre-kindergarten through 12.  In 2009, the school district was rated "recognized" by the Texas Education Agency.

References

External links
McLean ISD

School districts in Gray County, Texas
School districts in Collingsworth County, Texas
School districts in Donley County, Texas
School districts in Wheeler County, Texas